Sholpan Seydullayevna Kaliyeva (Şolpan Seidullaevna Kalieva; born July 5, 1980 in Almaty) is a Kazakhstani judoka, who played for the half-lightweight category. She is also a two-time Olympian, and a bronze medalist for her division at the 2002 Asian Games in Busan, South Korea.

Kaliyeva made her official debut for the 2004 Summer Olympics in Athens, where she lost the first preliminary match of women's half-lightweight class (52 kg), with an ippon and a tai otoshi (body drop), to Belgium's Ilse Heylen, who eventually won the bronze medal in this event.

At the 2008 Summer Olympics in Beijing, Kaliyeva competed for the second time in women's 52 kg class. She defeated Chinese Taipei's Shih Pei-Chun in the preliminary rounds, before losing out the quarterfinal match, with a waza-ari awasete ippon and an uchi mata gaeshi (inner thigh counter), to North Korea's An Kum-Ae. Because her opponent advanced further into the final, Kaliyeva offered another shot for the bronze medal by defeating Venezuela's Flor Velázquez and Belgium's Ilse Heylen (who ousted her from the previous Olympics) in the repechage rounds. Unfortunately, she finished only in fifth place, after losing out the bronze medal match to Algeria's Soraya Haddad, who successfully scored a waza-ari (half-point) and a kibisu gaeshi (one-hand reversal), at the end of the five-minute period.

References

External links

NBC Olympics Profile

Kazakhstani female judoka
Living people
Olympic judoka of Kazakhstan
Judoka at the 2004 Summer Olympics
Judoka at the 2008 Summer Olympics
Sportspeople from Almaty
1980 births
Asian Games medalists in judo
Judoka at the 2002 Asian Games
Judoka at the 2006 Asian Games
Judoka at the 2010 Asian Games
Asian Games bronze medalists for Kazakhstan
Medalists at the 2002 Asian Games
21st-century Kazakhstani women